Yoshitaka Takeda (15 February 1911 – August 1943) was a Japanese gymnast. He competed at the 1932 Summer Olympics and the 1936 Summer Olympics.

Olympic games positions

1932 Summer Olympics

1936 Summer Olympics

References

External links
 

1911 births
1943 deaths
Japanese male artistic gymnasts
Olympic gymnasts of Japan
Gymnasts at the 1932 Summer Olympics
Gymnasts at the 1936 Summer Olympics
Sportspeople from Ehime Prefecture
20th-century Japanese people